Visage is an extinct town in Towns County, in the U.S. state of Georgia.

History
A post office called Visage was established in 1875, and remained in operation until 1913. The community most likely was named after William Visage, a pioneer settler.

References

Geography of Towns County, Georgia
Ghost towns in Georgia (U.S. state)